Trevor A. Dawes is a Jamaican-born American librarian and educator. He is the vice provost for libraries and museums and May Morris University Librarian at the University of Delaware. Dawes served as the 76th president of the Association of College and Research Libraries (ACRL).

Early life 
Dawes was born in St. Catherine, Jamaica to Louise and Charles Dawes. The family relocated to Brooklyn, New York in 1980.

Education and career
Dawes received a BA in sociology from Columbia University in 1990 and an MA in educational administration from Teachers College, Columbia University in 1994. He earned a MLS from Rutgers University – New Brunswick in 2001 and Ed.M in educational leadership from Teachers College, Columbia University the following year.

Dawes is the Vice Provost for Libraries and Museums and May Morris University Librarian at the University of Delaware. In this capacity, Dawes is also responsible for the University of Delaware Press.

He served as Associate University Librarian at Washington University in St. Louis from 2013 to 2016. During his tenure, the WUSTL Libraries helped create Documenting Ferguson. This community-driven digital repository documents the unrest in Ferguson, Missouri after the murder of Michael Brown at the hands of police.

Prior to that, Dawes held library management positions at Columbia University and Princeton University.

Dawes has been an adjunct professor at Drexel University College of Computing and Informatics since 2006.

Dawes has participated in ALA committees, including serving as councilor at large on the ALA Council (2008-2011 and 2015-2018) and as a member of the ALA Committee on Committees (2010-2011). He was a member of the ALA Committee on Education (2011-2013) and served as chair of the Committee on Diversity (2006-2007). Dawes has also been active with the LLAMA, serving as a member of the Technical Services Committee (2005-2009), Membership Committee (2005-2006), and as an executive committee member at large of LLAMA-MAES (2003-2005).

Dawes has served as executive board member at large of the New Jersey Library Association (2009-2013) and president of the ACRL-NJ/NJLA-CUS (2009-2010). He served as secretary of the ACRL-NJ/NJLA-CUS (2007-2008) and co-chair of the mentoring committee of the New Jersey Library Association (2006-2009). He also was a member of the Cultural Diversity Committee of ACRL-NY (2003-2006).

In addition to his presidency, Dawes has served ACRL in various other capacities, including serving as co-chair of the ACRL 2017 Scholarships Component Committee, co-chair of the ACRL 2013 Conference Invited Papers Component Committee (2011-2013) and co-chair of the ACRL 2011 Conference Poster Sessions Component Committee (2009-2011). He was a member of the ACRL Scholarships Committee (2010-2011) and a member of the ACRL Appointments Committee (2007-2008). Dawes also served as chair of the ACRL Professional Development Coordinating Committee (2006-2009) and as chair of the ACRL Excellence in Academic Libraries Award Nominating Committee (2004-2005).

Dawes was elected to the Board of Directors Executive Committee of NERL in May 2017. He will serve a three-year term from July 2017 to June 2020.

Dawes was elected to a three-year term as a member of the ALA Executive Board in January, 2017. He will serve from October 2017 to October 2020.

ACRL presidency
Dawes was named president of the Association of College and Research Libraries in July, 2013 and served for one year. Prior to assuming the presidency, Dawes served as Vice President/President-Elect for one year. Similarly, he served as Past President during Campion's term.

During his tenure as president, Dawes continued his work on equity, diversity, and inclusion. He also focused on increasing financial literacy and worked to expand discussions around how libraries add value to their institutions.

Publications 

Dawes T, Sweetman K, Von Elm C. ARL SPEC Kit #290: Access Services. November 2005. 
Dawes T. Marketing and Managing Electronic Reserves. "Journal of Interlibrary Loan, Document Delivery & Electronic Reserve" [serial online]. October 2006;16(4):1-2.
Foss M, Dawes T. Assessing Reserve Management Systems: Do They Deliver on Their Promises?. "Journal of Interlibrary Loan, Document Delivery & Electronic Reserve" [serial online]. April 2010;20(2):67-75. 
Wang Y, Dawes T. The Next Generation Integrated Library System: A Promise Fulfilled?. "Information Technology and Libraries" [serial online]. September 2012;31(3):76-84. 
Dawes T. Crucible Moments: Inspiring Library Leadership, CHAPTER 6. "Crucible Moments: Inspiring Library Leadership" [monograph]. Mission Bell Media, Santa Barbara CA, 2016. 
Dawes T. Creating Leaders: An Examination of Academic and Research Library Leadership Institutes, CHAPTER 12. "Creating Leaders: An Examination of Academic and Research Library Leadership Institutes" [monograph]. ACRL, Washington DC, 2015.

Honors
Dawes was named a 2007 Library Journal "Mover & Shaker" because he helped create the New Jersey chapter of the Black Caucus of the American Library Association (BCALA).

BCALA Leadership Award (2007)
Princeton LGBT Center "Building Bridges" Award (2009)

References

External links
 Trevor A. Dawes's web site
 Association of College and Research Libraries homepage
 Bloomberg executive profile
 University of Delaware Library homepage

1969 births
Jamaican emigrants to the United States
Living people
American librarians
Columbia University librarians
Teachers College, Columbia University alumni